Dr John Wilkinson OBE was chairman of Salford RLFC between 1982 and 2013. He was born in Walkden, Lancashire, . He previously owned the Cebora welding company, who were the main jersey sponsors of Salford until 2006, when they were replaced by the Trafford Centre (although Cebora remained a minor jersey sponsor for Salford until recent years.)

He was given an OBE in 2005 for Services to the City of Salford and is also a Trustee of the Salfordian Hotel in Southport.

Wilkinson has also been given the Nickname of 'Mr Salford' due to his pride for the city he grew up in.
In 2009 Wilkinson received a Dr of Letters at the Lowry, Salford Quays.

A 25th Anniversary celebrating John Wilkinson's time at the club was arranged for the Super League game between Salford and Harlequins RL on 15 June 2007. He remained chairman of the club for 31 years until 2013, which remained the longest chairmanship of any major sports team around the world until 2017 when overtaken by FC Porto's Pinto da Costa.

Upon selling the club to Dr Marwan Koukash in 2013, he now continues to live in Salford with his family and still is an active chairman of his other businesses. He is no longer involved with the new Salford Rugby administration and spends the majority of his time in his hot tub and sauna.

People from Walkden
Officers of the Order of the British Empire
Year of birth missing (living people)
Living people
Rugby league chairmen and investors
Rugby league people in England